is a mountain located in the Kabato Mountains on the border of Tōbetsu and Shintotsukawa, Hokkaidō, Japan. Pinneshiri derives its name from the Ainu language pinne-sir, meaning "male land". The name of neighboring Mount Machine means "female land".

Climbing route
There are two climbing routes:
 Shintotsukawa course
 Dōmin no Mori course

On the first Sunday of July, Shintotsukawa hosts

References

Pinneshiri